Strangers from the Universe is an album by the American band Thinking Fellers Union Local 282, released in 1994 through Matador Records. The band supported the album by touring with Live. Strangers from the Universe was a moderate commercial success. Mark Davies used an Optigan keyboard on some of the tracks.

It was reissued in 2022.

Critical reception

Trouser Press wrote: "Berserk rhythms are presented with deadpan simplicity, like the sickly funk riff of 'Socket' that keeps sticking a banana peel in its own path." Spin opined that "for once the Thinking Fellers have made an album that you can comfortably hear straight through, and its dark mood deepens along the way."

The Washington Post determined that the album "can be elusive, but much of it deserves the title the band bestowed on the closing track, 'Noble Experiment'." The Santa Fe New Mexican noted that "sometimes stringed instruments, such as banjo or mandolin, are used as rhythm instruments, or to create a throbbing drone ... It's usually unsettling, but sometimes beautiful."

Track listing

Personnel 
Thinking Fellers Union Local 282
Mark Davies – vocals, guitar, bass guitar, banjo, Optigan, brass instruments, percussion
Anne Eickelberg – vocals, bass guitar, keyboards, percussion
Brian Hageman – vocals, guitar, mandolin
Jay Paget – vocals, drums, guitar, keyboards, sampler
Hugh Swarts – vocals, guitar, percussion
Production and additional personnel
Gail Butensky – photography
Greg Freeman – production, engineering
John Frentress – sculptures
Margaret Murray – design
Thinking Fellers Union Local 282 – production, recording

References

External links 
 

Thinking Fellers Union Local 282 albums
1994 albums
Matador Records albums